Trenque Lauquen is a city in the west of the province of Buenos Aires, Argentina,  from Buenos Aires City and  from the border with the province of La Pampa, on the intersection of National Routes 5 and 33.

The name of the city means "Round Lagoon" in the Mapuche language. It was founded on 12 April 1876 by the advancing troops of Colonel Conrado Excelso Villegas, under orders from the Minister of War Adolfo Alsina, as the center of operations of the North Division of the Border Commandancy, during the Conquest of the Desert (the campaign to subject the territories originally occupied by aboriginal tribes to the government of Buenos Aires). The partido was officially created on 28 July 1886.

The city is served by Ñanco Lauquen Airport.

Climate
Similar to the rest of the Pampas, Trenque Lauquen has a temperate climate. Under the Köppen climate classification system, Trenque Lauquen has a humid subtropical climate (Cfa) with hot summers and cool winters.

References

 
 Official website and portal

Populated places in Buenos Aires Province
Populated places established in 1876
Cities in Argentina
1876 establishments in Argentina
Argentina